(mentsh, from Middle High German , from Old High German mennisco; akin to Old English human being, man) means "a person of integrity and honor".

The key to being 'a real mensch' is nothing less than character, rectitude, dignity, a sense of what is right, responsible, decorous." The term is used as a high compliment, implying the rarity and value of that individual's qualities.

Overview
In Yiddish, mentsh roughly means "a good person". The word has migrated as a loanword into American English, where a mensch is a particularly good person, similar to a "stand-up guy", a person with the qualities one would hope for in a friend or trusted colleague. Mentshlekhkeyt refers to the properties which make a person a mensch.

During the Age of Enlightenment, in Germany the term , in the philosophical sense of compassion, was used in Humanism to describe what characterizes a better human being.

The word  and the underlying concept have had an impact on popular culture. For example, the "Mensch on a Bench" is a Hanukkah-themed book and doll set. A life-size version of the doll has been adopted by Team Israel at the World Baseball Classic as their mascot. According to pitcher Gabe Cramer, "The Mensch is a great way to have fun in the dugout while reminding us of why we're here and who we're representing."

See also

Moral idealist

References

Yiddish words and phrases
German words and phrases